Nithin Lukose (4 May 1986) born in Wayanad is an Indian film director, writer and sound designer known for his works in Malayalam, Hindi, Kannada and Telugu films. Nithin Lukose is a graduate at the Film and Television Institute of India, Pune He has been a part of many films. PAKA (River of Blood) is his debut feature film as director. The film was premiered at Toronto international Film festival (TIFF). As a sound designer of Thithi, won Golden Leopard - Filmmakers of the Present, Recently completed Sandeep Aur Pinky Faraar with director Dibakar Banerjee as the sound designer. Production sound mixer for Hollywood directors like Bennet Miller and Julie Taymor when they shot their documentary and film in India.

Filmography

References

External links
 
Filmmaker Nithin Lukose on ‘Paka:The River of Blood’  
‘Paka: The River Of Blood’, ‘Ambush’ win WIP awards at India’s Film Bazaar  
IFFK from February 10, to be held in venues across 4 districts
FILMMAKER NITHIN LUKOSE ON MAKING HIS MALAYALAM DÉBUT FEATURE, ‘PAKA:THE RIVER OF BLOOD’ 
Filmmaker Nithin Lukose on ‘Paka:The River of Blood’ 
 Don't do it for fame or money - Sound Designer Nithin Lukose 
 'Thithi' Review: Filmmaking at its best
 Sundance Unveils Female-Powered Lineup Featuring Taylor Swift, Gloria Steinem, Abortion Road Trip Drama 
 ഫസ്റ്റ് ലുക്കിൽ ഞെട്ടിച്ച് സൗബിൻ; നസ്രിയയുടെ അനിയനൊപ്പം 'അമ്പിളി' എത്തുന്നു...
Ambili movie review: A Soubin show all the way...
 [How Malayalam film 'Paka', to premiere at TIFF, was made] https://www.thenewsminute.com/article/how-malayalam-film-paka-premiere-tiff-was-made-153357
[It comes from my grandmother's stories: Nithin Lukose on his TIFF bound 'Paka'] https://www.newindianexpress.com/entertainment/malayalam/2021/aug/04/it-comes-from-my-grandmothers-stories-nithin-lukose-on-his-tiff-bound-paka-2340104.html
 With ‘Paka’, Nithin Lukose takes a tale rooted in Wayanad to a global audience 
Nithin Lukose's Paka picked up by TIFF; Anurag Kashyap to co-produce 
Malayalam film ‘Paka’ (River of Blood) to premiere at TIFF 
 Stories of Wayanad, all the way to Toronto film fete 
A Stitch in Time 
വയനാടിന്റെ കഥ, ആ കയങ്ങളിൽ മരണപ്പെട്ടവരുടെയും; 'പക' ചർച്ചയാകുമ്പോൾ സംവിധായകൻ പറയുന്നു....

1985 births
Living people
People from Wayanad district
Film and Television Institute of India alumni
Indian sound designers